, known professionally as Klaha, is a Japanese former singer-songwriter. He is best known as third vocalist of the visual kei rock band Malice Mizer from 2000 to 2001. He was previously in the 1990s new wave band Pride of Mind, and started a solo career after leaving Malice Mizer.

History 
His first band was the new wave group Pride of Mind, active from 1992-1996. He first played with Malice Mizer in 2000, on their single "Shiroi Hada ni Kuruu Ai to Kanashimi no Rondo", providing vocals, although he was credited as "Fourth blood relative". He then provided vocals on their album Bara no Seidou. A year after Malice Mizer, Klaha started a solo career, but with a drastic change of style he performed pop music. After a live appearance in April 2004, Klaha's releases and performances stopped without explanation. In 2007, he stated that he would be returning that year, but nothing happened and no information has been given since his abrupt leave in 2004.

Malice Mizer guitarist Mana said he tried contacting Klaha in regards to him participating in the band's 25th anniversary concerts in September 2018, but received no response.

Discography

Solo 
 Nostal Lab - album (December 4, 2002)
 "Shinsho Prism (Instrumental)" (心象プリズム (Instrumental))- 00:55
 "Scape: With Transparent Wings" - 03:39
 "Taiyō no Ori" (太陽の檻) - 05:32
 "Red Room: Garasu no Hana Red Room" (Red Room ~硝子の花~) - 03:45
 "Penguin" - 06:13
 "Kanjou Prism (Instrumental)" - 00:44
 "Kiseki no Koe" - 05:00
 "Shokoreito" (ショコレイト) - 04:51
 "Kamereon no Seppun" (カメレオンの接吻) - 03:43
 "Sayonara" (サヨナラ) - 05:41
 "Green: Tsutaetai Omoi" (Green ~伝えたい想い~) - 04:27
 "Kaihō Prism" (解放プリズム ) - 02:12

 "Märchen" - single (March 26, 2003)
 "Mitsu (Hisoka) (Instrumental)" (密 (ひそか) (Instrumental)) - 01:05
 "Märchen" - 04:31
 "Stay in the Rain" - 04:30
 "Deatta hi no Mama" (出逢った日のまま) - 04:49
 "Märchen (Instrumental)" - 04:30
 "Deatta hi no Mama (Instrumental)" (出逢った日のまま (Instrumental)) - 04:47

 Märchen - VHS/DVD (July 16, 2003)
 "Mitsu (Hisoka) ~ Märchen"
 "Stay in the Rain"
 DVD and VHS have different bonus footage
 Setsubō (切望) - mini-album (February 16, 2004)
 "Hizashi" (陽射し) - 04:41
 "Souten Hakugetsu" (蒼天白月) - 05:06
 "Gekkō: Instrumental" (激昴 ~Instrumental~) - 02:24
 "Kibou no Tenshi" (希望の天地) - 05:12
 "Hekiya no Hate" (僻野ノ涯) - 05:23
 "Gyakkō: Konosaka no Mukōni" (逆光 ~この坂の向こうに~) - 05:19

With Pride of Mind 
 First demo tape (1994)
 "Dance with Moon" - 04:39
 "Decayed" - 01:16
 "Angels of Night" - 03:47
 "Black Sun" - 03:02

 Promotional demo tape (Unknown Date)
 "The Sky Was Blue (My Supreme Love) - 07:13
 "Decayed" - 01:09
 "Angels of Night" - 03:30
 "Virulent Red" - 03:39

 Unknown demo tape (Unknown Date)
 "The Sky Was Blue (My Supreme Love)
 "Virulent Red"
 "Dance with Moon"
 "Decayed"
 "Angels of Night"

 Second demo tape (1994/5)
 "The Sky Was Blue" - 07:23
 "Virulent Red" - 03:39
 "Hikari no Naka de" (光の中で) - 04:48
 "Lucent (live version)"

 Image Sonic - various artists compilation (August 29, 1994)
 "The Sky Was Blue" (track 9)
 "Hikari no Naka de" (光の中で, track 10)
 Live video tape (November 1, 1995)
 Recorded on August 29, 1994 at the Shinsaibashi Muse Hall
 "Intro: Edvard Grieg - In the Hall of the Mountain King (SE)" - 02:55
 "Salome" - 04:16
 "Unknown Title" - 03:33
 "MC" - 00:45
 "Tale of One Night" - 06:00
 "The Sky Was Blue" - 07:29
 "Dance with Moon" - 04:30
 "Red" -03:48
 "Angels of Night" 04:13
 "Outro: The Buggles - I Am A Camera (SE)"

 Systems of Romance - album (November 11, 1995)
 "Love Light [I Feel Your Breath]" - 04:56
 "Material World" - 03:36
 "Walking in My Life" - 03:24
 "Bright Moments" - 05:21
 "Flowers" - 04:18
 "The Sky Was Blue [My Supreme Love]" - 07:24
 "Red" - 03:49
 "Out of the Air" - 05:43
 "Salome [Kikai Shikake no Romansu]" (Salome 機械仕掛のロマンス) - 04:28
 "The Flower Bloom in the Future" - 04:45

With Malice Mizer 

 "Shiroi Hada ni Kuruu ai to Kanashimi no Rondo" (白い肌に烂う愛と哀しみの輪舞, July 26, 2000)
 Bara no Seidou (薔薇の聖堂, August 23, 2000)
 "Gardenia" (May 30, 2001)
 "Beast of Blood" (June 21, 2001)
 "Mayonaka ni Kawashita Yakusoku: Bara no Konrei" (真夜中に交わした約束 ～薔薇の婚礼～, October 30, 2001)
 "Garnet: Kindan no Sono e" (Garnet ～禁断の園へ～, November 30, 2001)

References

External links 
 
 Malice Mizer website 

Visual kei musicians
Malice Mizer members
Japanese male singer-songwriters
Japanese singer-songwriters
Japanese male pop singers
Living people
1970 births